The women's 'Hard Styles with Weapons' category involved thirteen contestants from eight countries across two continents - Europe and North America.  Each contestant went through seven performances (2 minutes each) with the totals added up at the end of the event.  The gold medal winner was Veronika Dombrovskaya from Belarus with compatriot Maria Pekarchik gaining silver.  Ekaterina Chizhikova from Russia claimed the bronze medal spot.

Results

See also
List of WAKO Amateur World Championships
List of WAKO Amateur European Championships
List of female kickboxers

References

External links
 WAKO World Association of Kickboxing Organizations Official Site

Kickboxing events at the WAKO World Championships 2007 Coimbra
2007 in kickboxing
Kickboxing in Portugal